The Aussinanis project is a uranium deposit located in the western part of Namibia in Erongo Region. Aussinanis represents a uranium reserve estimated at 34.88 million tonnes of ore grading 0.02% uranium.

References 

Uranium mines in Namibia